Lloyd Hughes may refer to:

Lloyd Hughes (actor) (1897–1958), American film actor
Lloyd Hughes (jockey), jockey in the 1878 and 1881 Withers Stakes 
Lloyd Hughes (politician) (1912–1994), Australian politician
Lloyd Herbert Hughes (1921–1943), American Air Force pilot